Ashleigh Rainey (born 28 April 1985) is a Northern Irish international lawn and indoor bowler.

Bowls career
Ashleigh has played for Ireland both indoors and outdoors.

In 2019, she won the triples bronze medal at the Atlantic Bowls Championships and in 2020 she was selected for the 2020 World Outdoor Bowls Championship in Australia.

In 2022, she competed in the women's triples and the Women's fours at the 2022 Commonwealth Games.

References

Female lawn bowls players from Northern Ireland
Living people
1985 births
Bowls players at the 2022 Commonwealth Games